The Real Academia de Ciencias Morales y Políticas (RACMP, English: Royal Academy of Moral and Political Sciences) is a forum for the sharing of social, economic, philosophical, political and juridical knowledge. It was created on 30 September 1857, by Royal Decree, during the reign of the Queen Isabella II.

The Academy provides a place for debate on ideas and major questions facing our society; serving as a center for the diffusion of knowledge and an investigative laboratory. Its work is based on the cumulative knowledge of its Academicians; significant personalities from the fields of politics, economics and social sciences of the last century and a half.

The objective was to establish a counterpart to the Real Academia de la Historia. In pursuit of that goal, its first members included progressive thinkers such as Salustiano Olózaga in addition to more moderate figures, which included Juan Bravo Murillo and Modesto Lafuente.

The Directorate of the Academy is composed of a President and five other members who serve in executive functions and ensure compliance with statutes and regulations. The Academy itself is divided into four sections: Ciencias Filosóficas, Ciencias Políticas y jurídicas, Ciencias Sociales and Ciencias Económicas. 

Lectures, presentations and assorted events are also provided for the public. The library, which contains over 140,000 volumes, is open to researchers from around the world.

Among those who have been members of the Academy are politicians and jurists such as Francisco Martínez de la Rosa, Antonio Alcalá Galiano, Antonio Cánovas del Castillo,  Julián Besteiro and Faustino Rodríguez-San Pedro. Notable members who were specialists in various fields of the social sciences include Antonio Cavanilles, Marcelino Menéndez y Pelayo, Joaquín Ruiz-Giménez and Salvador de Madariaga.

Since 2015, the President has been the economist, Juan Velarde Fuertes.

Presidents of the Academy 

 Pedro José Pidal y Carniado
 Lorenzo Arrazola y García
  
 Manuel García Barzanallana 
 Francisco de Cárdenas Espejo 
 Laureano Figuerola y Ballester 
 Antonio Aguilar y Correa 
 Alejandro Groizard y Gómez de la Serna
 Joaquín Sánchez de Toca y Calvo 
 Antonio Goicoechea Cosculluela 
  
 José María de Yanguas Messía 
 Alfonso García Valdecasas 
 Luis Díez del Corral y Pedruzo 
 Enrique Fuentes Quintana
 Sabino Fernández Campo
 Marcelino Oreja Aguirre 
 Juan Velarde Fuertes
 Miguel Herrero y Rodríguez de Miñón
 Benigno Pendás García (current)

Further reading 
 Miguel Martorell Linares: "De ciencias sociales y ángeles custodios: la Real Academia de Ciencias Morales y Políticas en la guerra civil y la autarquía", Historia y Política, #8, 2002, pp. 229-252.

External links 

RACMYP official website.

Think tanks based in Spain
C